Emily Murphy (born 2 March 2003) is an English footballer who plays as a forward for North Carolina Tar Heels women's soccer team.

Club career 
On 20 November 2019, Murphy made her senior debut when being subbed on against Tottenham Hotspur in the group stage of the Continental League Cup in a game where Chelsea won 5–1.

International career 
In October 2019, Murphy was called to up to the England U17 team to play in the 2020 U17 UEFA Women's Under-17 Championship qualification games and played against Croatia, Bosnia & Herzegovina and Belgium. Murphy scored one of the goals in the 4–1 win against Belgium.

Murphy was one of four Irish-eligible players to be invited to a senior Republic of Ireland national team training camp in April 2021. Ireland coach Vera Pauw said Murphy had not yet decided whether to declare for England or Ireland.

Career statistics

Club 
As of 20 June 2021

References

External links 
North Carolina profile

Living people
2003 births
Women's Super League players
English women's footballers
Chelsea F.C. Women players
English people of Irish descent
Women's association football forwards
Birmingham City W.F.C. players
North Carolina Tar Heels women's soccer players
England women's youth international footballers